The Fayetteville Convention was a meeting by 271 delegates from North Carolina to ratify the US Constitution. Governor Samuel Johnston presided over the convention, which met in Fayetteville, North Carolina, from November 16 to 23, 1789 to debate on and decide on the ratification of the Constitution, which had recommended to the states by the Philadelphia Convention during the summer of 1787. The delegates ratified the Constitution by a vote of 194 to 77, thus making North Carolina the 12th state to ratify the constitution.

Location

The Fayetteville Convention was held at the State House in Fayetteville, which was a large brick building built in 1788 in anticipation of Fayetteville becoming the capital of North Carolina.  Although the North Carolina General Assembly met in the building in 1789, 1789 and 1793, it moved permanently to Raleigh, North Carolina in 1794. The State House, along with most of Fayetteville, was destroyed by a large fire in 1831. The Market House was built on the site in 1832.

Proceedings

The prior Hillsborough Convention had decided neither to ratify or to reject the Constitution. The Federalists waged a successful campaign in the 1789 elections, which resulted in Anti-Federalists receiving less than one third of the 272 seats at the Fayetteville Convention. One factor leading to the Federalist majority was the election of George Washington as President and the resulting stable government, which dispelled Anti-Federalists' fears about unbridled federal power. Influential Federalists controlled most of the North Carolina newspapers and used them to vigorously support ratification of the Constitution to the demise of Anti-Federalists. The introduction of the Bill of Rights also helped to neutralize the Ant-Federalists' objections.  Thus, when the Hillsborough Convention opened on November 16, the outcome for ratification of the Constitution had been almost assured.

As a final compromise, the delegates agreed to present to Congress eight amendments not covered by the proposed Bill of Rights. They included issues such as limits on congressional taxing power and on the enlistment terms for soldiers. On November 20, William Richardson Davie brought the ratification question to the Convention, which it approved with a vote of 195 to 77. As a result, North Carolina became the twelfth state to approve the U.S. Constitution. After the vote, John Huske of Wilmington led a walkout of 68 Anti-Federalists from the chambers. The convention was adjourned on November 23.

The following amendments proposed by James Galloway were unanimously approved by the convention on November 23:
 "That Congress shall not alter, modify, or interfere in the times, places and manner of holding elections for Senators and Representatives, or either of them, except when the Legislature of any State shall neglect, refuse, or be disabled by invasion or rebellion to prescribe the same, or in case when the provision made by the State is so imperfect as that no consequent election is had."
 "That Congress shall not, directly or indirectly, either by themselves or through the Judiciary, interfere with any one of the States in the redemption of paper money already emitted and now in circulation, or in liquidating and discharging the public securities of any one of the States; but each and every State shall have the exclusive right of making such laws and regulations for the above purposes, as they shall think proper."
 "That the members of the Senate and House of Representatives shall be ineligible to and incapable of holding any civil office under the authority of the United States during the time for which they shall respectively be elected."
 "That the journals of the proceedings of the Senate and House of Representatives shall be published at least once in every year, except such parts thereof relating to treaties, alliances, or military operations, as in their judgment require secrecy."
 "That a regular statement and account of the receipts and expenditures of all public monies shall be published at least once in every year."
 "That no navigation law, or law regulating commerce, shall be passed, without the consent of two-thirds of the members present in both Houses."
 "That no soldier shall be enlisted for any longer term than four years, except in time of war, and then for no longer term than the continuance of the war."
 "That some tribunal, other than the Senate, be provided for trying impeachments of Senators."

Delegates
 

There were 271 delegates from 61 counties and six cities/districts of North Carolina.   Some counties later became part of the state of Tennessee in 1796.  Governor Samuel Johnston from Perquimans County presiding over the convention.  Charles Johnson from Chowan County was the vice-president of the Convention.  John Hunt and James Taylor were appointed as secretary and assistant secretary, respectively, of the convention.  Peter Gooding, James Mulloy, William Murphy, and Nicholas Murphey were appointed as doorkeepers of the convention.:

See also
 Hillsborough Convention
 History of the United States Constitution
 Market House (Fayetteville, North Carolina)
 Scene at the Signing of the Constitution of the United States, 1940 painting by Howard Chandler Christy, shows Richard Dobbs Spaight, William Blount, and Hugh Williamson of North Carolina at center stage
 Timeline of drafting and ratification of the United States Constitution

References

1780 in the United States
1789 in North Carolina
History of North Carolina
Ratification of the United States Constitution
1789 in American politics
Fayetteville, North Carolina